The 2017 NCAA Division I Women's Basketball Championship Game was the final game of the 2017 NCAA Division I women's basketball tournament.  The game was played on April 2, 2017, at American Airlines Center in Dallas. The South Carolina Gamecocks defeated the Mississippi State Bulldogs, 67–55, to claim their first-ever national championship.

Participants 
Going into the game, South Carolina and Mississippi State have met 35 times in women's basketball since December 29, 1984, with the Gamecocks holding a one-game edge over the Bulldogs in Southeastern Conference (SEC) play. In the 2016–17 SEC regular season, South Carolina lost twice and Mississippi State three times (once to the Gamecocks). Notched as the top two seeds for the 2017 SEC tournament, the teams advanced to the championship game, where South Carolina won 59–49.

In the Final Four of the tournament, South Carolina defeated Stanford, 62–53. In the other semifinal game, Mississippi State defeated Connecticut with a buzzer beater, winning 66–64, and ending Connecticut's 111-game winning streak.

Game summary 

South Carolina led 36–26 at half time and extended this lead further in the beginning of the third quarter. Mississippi State then rallied, and at one point trailed by only 4 points (54–50). However, South Carolina never relinquished their lead, and held on to win, ultimately by 12 points. The South Carolina strategy was to focus on close shots, with the team only attempting three 3-pointers in the entire game.

A'ja Wilson was South Carolina's top scorer with 23 points. Mississippi State guard Morgan William, who had excelled previously in the tournament, was benched for much of the game, scoring 8 points in 23 minutes of playing time.

Media coverage 
The Championship Game was televised in the United States by ESPN. Dave O'Brien gave the play-by-play, with Doris Burke and Kara Lawson as the color analysts, and Holly Rowe as the sideline reporter. Maria Taylor, Rebecca Lobo and Andy Landers provided studio coverage.

See also 
 2017 NCAA Men's Division I Basketball Championship Game
 2017 NCAA Women's Division I Basketball Tournament

References 

NCAA Division I Women's Basketball Championship Game
NCAA Division I Women's Basketball Championship Games
Mississippi State Bulldogs women's basketball
South Carolina Gamecocks women's basketball
Basketball in the Dallas–Fort Worth metroplex
College sports in Texas
Sports competitions in Dallas
2010s in Dallas
2017 in Texas
NCAA Division I Women's Basketball Championship Game